Tomasz Mamiński (born July 9, 1943 in Puławy, General Government) is a Polish politician, a leader of the National Party of Retirees and Pensioners (KPEiR) and former Sejm Member.  He is a former deputy head of the Federated Parliamentary Club.

References

1943 births
Living people
People from Puławy
People from the General Government
National Party of Retirees and Pensioners politicians
Members of the Polish Sejm 2001–2005